Andrew Steuart (1822 – 27 January 1905) was a British Conservative politician.

Parliamentary Career
Steuart was elected Conservative MP for Cambridge at the 1857 general election and held the seat until he resigned in 1863.

Family
On 11 May 1847, he married his cousin; Elizabeth Georgiana Graham Gordon, daughter of Thomas Duff Gordon of Park. Together they had one daughter
Harriet Elizabeth Steuart (3 January 1849-3 February 1908)

References

External links
 

UK MPs 1857–1859
UK MPs 1859–1865
1822 births
1905 deaths
Conservative Party (UK) MPs for English constituencies